Haycroft is a deserted village in the civil parish of Spurstow, in Cheshire, England, located at , immediately east of Haycroft farm. Aerial photography has shown evidence of a medieval village and a field system. The site is a scheduled monument.

Description
The earthworks are located a little to the north west of the present village of Spurstow, which is believed to have subsequently contracted or moved. They lie in a valley, which formerly contained a stream. There are six house platforms which are 25–40 metres2 in area, each of which is surrounded by a 2-metre ditch. To the north side of the platforms and abutting them there is evidence of medieval ridge and furrow ploughing. A later causeway runs north–south, bisecting the site. The existing lane to Haycroft farm represents part of an old road from Ridley Green to Beeston.

See also

List of scheduled monuments in Cheshire (1066–1539)
History of Cheshire
History of agriculture in Cheshire

References

Former populated places in Cheshire
Archaeological sites in Cheshire